The Green Quarry Site, designated 20OA7, is an archaeological site located near Pentwater, Michigan.  It was listed on the National Register of Historic Places in 1972. The site, covering , is the only known source of Lambrix chert, which was used for a variety of prehistoric tools.

References

Quarries in the United States
Archaeological sites on the National Register of Historic Places in Michigan
Geography of Oceana County, Michigan
National Register of Historic Places in Oceana County, Michigan